Kamrun Nesa Nilu ( – 28 December 2015) was a Bangladeshi physician and politician from Shariatpur belonging to Jatiya Party. She was a member of the Jatiya Sangsad. She also served as the Health advisor of the Government of Bangladesh during the regime of Hussein Muhammad Ershad.

Biography
Nilu was elected as a member of the Jatiya Sangsad from Reserved Women's Seat-23 in 1986. She also appointed as the Health advisor of the Government of Bangladesh.

Nilu died on 27 December 2015 at the age of 58.

References

1950s births
2015 deaths
People from Shariatpur District
3rd Jatiya Sangsad members
Jatiya Party politicians
Women members of the Jatiya Sangsad
20th-century Bangladeshi physicians